Kyle Edmund and Frederico Ferreira Silva were the defending champions, but were not eligible to compete this year.

Benjamin Bonzi and Quentin Halys won the title, defeating Lucas Miedler and Akira Santillan in the final, 6–3, 6–3.

Seeds

Draw

Finals

Top half

Bottom half

External links 
 Draw

Boys' Doubles
2014